William Wallace Barron (December 8, 1911 – November 12, 2002) was an American Democratic politician in West Virginia. He was the state's 26th Governor from 1961 to 1965.

Life and career
He was born in Elkins, West Virginia.  He attended Washington and Lee University and the West Virginia University Law School. During World War II, he served in the United States Army. In 1949, he was elected mayor of Elkins. He became a member of the West Virginia House of Delegates in 1950 and was re-elected in 1952. He resigned his seat when appointed as Liquor Control Commissioner by Governor William C. Marland subsequent to the 1952 election. He was nominated to Attorney General in 1956.

In 1960, he was elected governor of West Virginia and continued the clean government and civil rights reforms that had been instituted by his predecessor, Cecil H. Underwood.

He died on November 12, 2002, in Charlotte, North Carolina.

Corruption trial and prison 
On August 30, 1968, Barron was acquitted of federal charges concerning alleged money kickbacks and rigged state contract schemes in which he and several of his associates were involved. It was later realized that Barron and his wife, Opal Barron, had bribed the jury foreman. Barron was indicted, pleaded guilty and was sentenced to 25 years in prison. He served four years of his sentence.

See also 
 Virginia Mae Brown

References

External links 
 Biography of William W. Barron
 Inaugural Address of William W. Barron
 William W. Barron's Influence on the West Virginia State Centennial Celebration

|-

|-

1911 births
2002 deaths
20th-century American lawyers
20th-century American politicians
American politicians convicted of bribery
Democratic Party governors of West Virginia
Disbarred American lawyers
Mayors of places in West Virginia
Democratic Party members of the West Virginia House of Delegates
Military personnel from West Virginia
People from Elkins, West Virginia
Presbyterians from West Virginia
United States Army personnel of World War II
United States Army soldiers
Washington and Lee University alumni
West Virginia Attorneys General
West Virginia University College of Law alumni